Herbert Henry Stone (born April 1873) was an English footballer. His regular position was at full back. He was born in St Albans, Hertfordshire. He played for Manchester United and Ashton North End.

External links
MUFCInfo.com profile

1873 births
English footballers
Manchester United F.C. players
Year of death missing
Association football fullbacks
Sportspeople from St Albans